Ma Dalton is a Lucky Luke comic written by Goscinny and illustrated by Morris. It was first published in French in the year 1971 by Dargaud. English editions of this French series have been published by Cinebooks and Tara Press.  Ma Dalton was inspired by real-life Ma Barker.

Plot
Mrs. Dalton, the mother of the Dalton Brothers, spends a relatively quiet life in retirement until she invites her four sons for a visit. At first, Joe uses Ma's reputation among the fellow citizens to commit robberies — and later, Mum, for the love of her sons (Averell in particular), decides to return to family business once more, presenting Lucky Luke with an additional headache: How to deal with a reckless old lady shootist?

Characters 

 Ma Dalton: Inspired by the famous American criminal Ma Barker.
 The Daltons: Her sons.

External links
 Lucky Luke official site album index 
 Goscinny website on Lucky Luke

Comics by Morris (cartoonist)
Lucky Luke albums
1971 graphic novels
Works originally published in Spirou (magazine)
Works by René Goscinny
Fiction about prison escapes
Cultural depictions of Ma Barker
Dalton, Ma